Tennis on Hughes was the de facto name of a series of syndicated professional tennis telecasts, produced by the Hughes Television Network. The telecasts were sold to commercial stations on an individual market basis by Taft Broadcasting.

In 1978, Hughes televised eight tournaments, all slotted for 6 to 8 p.m. on Saturdays and 5 to 7 p.m. on Sundays (all Eastern time). The announcers for these broadcasts were Bud Collins and Donald Dell.

The tournaments were the following:
Australian Open
Canadian Open
French Open
Italian Open
US Open
U.S. Pro Championships
Washington Star International

References

Hughes
1978 American television series debuts
1978 American television series endings
1970s American television series
Hughes Television Network